Penstemon spectabilis is a species of penstemon known by the common name showy penstemon or showy beardtongue. It is native to  southern California and Baja California, where it grows in the chaparral, scrub, and woodlands of the coastal mountain ranges.

Description
Penstemon spectabilis is a perennial herb growing erect to a maximum height often exceeding one meter. The thin leaves are lance-shaped to oval, serrated on the edges, and up to 10 centimeters in length. The oppositely arranged pairs may fuse about the stem at the bases. The inflorescence bears wide-mouthed tubular purple-blue flowers which may be over 3 centimeters long. The throat is lighter in color, lavender to nearly white, and hairless inside. Flowers bloom April to June.

This plant is often a pioneer species in habitat recently disturbed. It is pollinated by wasps such as Pseudomasaris vespoides, as well as by hummingbirds.

Taxonomy

Varieties 

 Penstemon spectabilis var. spectabilis   
The nominate variety. The inflorescence is glabrous (lacking hair). This variety is distributed across the San Gabriel and San Bernardino Mountains, and the Peninsular Ranges from California to Mexico, reaching its southern distribution at northwest the foothills of the Sierra de San Pedro Martir in Baja California.
 Penstemon spectabilis var. subinteger    
A variety endemic to Baja California, commonly known as the Peninsular showy beardtongue, found from the vicinity of San Telmo and San Quintin south to the Bahia de Los Angeles.
 Penstemon spectabilis var. subvicosus    
This variety has a glandular inflorescence. Native to the Transverse Ranges of California.

References

External links

Jepson Manual Treatment - Penstemon spectabilis
Penstemon spectabilis - Photo gallery

spectabilis
Flora of California
Flora of Baja California
Natural history of the California chaparral and woodlands
Natural history of the Peninsular Ranges
Natural history of the Santa Monica Mountains
Natural history of the Transverse Ranges
Garden plants of North America
Drought-tolerant plants
Bird food plants
Flora without expected TNC conservation status